The white-eared barbet (Stactolaema leucotis) is a species of bird in the family Lybiidae (African barbets).
It is found in Eswatini, Kenya, Malawi, Mozambique, South Africa, Tanzania, and Zimbabwe.

Gallery

References

External links

 White-eared barbet - Species text in The Atlas of Southern African Birds

white-eared barbet
Birds of East Africa
white-eared barbet
Taxonomy articles created by Polbot